Samuel Dennis Warren may refer to: 

 Samuel D. Warren, an American paper magnate
 Samuel D. Warren II, an American attorney